Eva Helen Ulvros (born 1954) is a Swedish historian and author. She is a professor at the University of Lund, where she specializes in the social development of gender identity and cultural aspects of history in Sweden. She is a native of Lund.

Professional background 
Ulvros has taught at the University of Lund since 1996. She has additionally taught courses at Lund's Centre for Gender Studies. Since 2008, she has held the title of professor in Lund University's history department.

Published works

References 

1954 births
Living people
20th-century Swedish historians
Swedish women historians
Academic staff of Lund University
Swedish women academics